Afrin Subdistrict  is a subdistrict of Afrin District in northwestern Aleppo Governorate of northern Syria. The administrative centre is the city of Afrin.

At the 2004 census, the subdistrict had a population of 66,188.

Cities, towns and villages

References 

Afrin District
Afrin